Pablo Cortizo (born September 1, 1989 in La Plata) is an Argentine footballer currently playing as a defensive midfielder for Los Andes.

Game Features
Pablo is a central midfielder with good technical characteristics and wide vision of the game. He uses his height to go head both in attack and defense and balls in motion, great resilience fast delivery of the ball and is a very tidy player tactically able to meet the necessary requirements.

References

External links
 Profile at BDFA 
 

1989 births
Living people
Argentine footballers
Argentine expatriate footballers
Association football midfielders
Ferro Carril Oeste footballers
Colegio Nacional Iquitos footballers
Racing Club de Montevideo players
FC Inter Turku players
Veikkausliiga players
Ayia Napa FC players
Cypriot Second Division players
Tiro Federal footballers
Gimnasia y Esgrima de Jujuy footballers
Gimnasia y Esgrima de Mendoza footballers
Club Atlético Patronato footballers
Club Atlético Mitre footballers
Club Atlético Brown footballers
Independiente Rivadavia footballers
Club Atlético Los Andes footballers
Argentine expatriate sportspeople in Peru
Argentine expatriate sportspeople in Finland
Argentine expatriate sportspeople in Uruguay
Argentine expatriate sportspeople in Cyprus
Expatriate footballers in Peru
Expatriate footballers in Finland
Expatriate footballers in Uruguay
Expatriate footballers in Cyprus
Footballers from La Plata